Cyperus plateilema is a species of sedge that is native to eastern parts of Africa and south western parts of the Middle East.

See also 
 List of Cyperus species

References 

plateilema
Plants described in 1936
Flora of Yemen
Flora of Tanzania
Flora of Ethiopia
Flora of Eritrea
Flora of Kenya
Flora of Sudan
Flora of Uganda
Taxa named by Georg Kükenthal